The RMK 30 (Rückstoßfreie Maschinenkanone 30; recoilless autocannon) is a recoilless 30 mm caliber autocannon firing caseless 30 × 250 mm ammunition cartridges. The gun was developed by the German company Mauser, which is now a subsidiary of the Rheinmetall group.

The German Bundesamt für Wehrtechnik und Beschaffung (BWB) required a new recoilless autocannon, therefore the development of the RMK 30 started in 1993. Unlike former recoilless weapons it is capable of firing salvos or in fully automatic mode without producing recoil. It is a three-chamber revolver cannon; the revolver and firing mechanism are driven by an electric motor, allowing variable rates of fire of up to 300 rounds/min. A fraction of the propellant gases is ejected to the rear of the cannon, compensating for the recoil and allowing lightweight and less rigid mounts.

Though recoilless, the RMK 30 has a higher muzzle energy than conventional 30 mm autocannons.

RMK 30 cannons have been proposed as upgrade for the Bundeswehr's (German armed forces) Tiger UHT attack helicopters. The UHT version currently lacks a gun, since the German Army was not happy with the recoil, accuracy and the range of the French GIAT 30 mm cannon which is fitted to other Tiger versions.

In 1996 it was tested mounted on a Wiesel AWC.

An unusual study (Project MORAINE) suggests mounting an RMK 30 gun in a retractable mast on a Type 212 submarine. Such masts would extend the capabilities of submarines, which currently lack appropriate means to fight small surface targets or just give warning shots. This study has directly led to the Muraena concept.

Gallery

References
 Manufacturer's page

30 mm artillery
Aircraft guns
Autocannon
Caseless firearms
Post–Cold War artillery of Germany
RMK30
Post–Cold War weapons of Germany
Military equipment introduced in the 1990s